UMTAS or Mizrak-U (Uzun Menzilli Tanksavar Sistemi) is a modern long range air-to-surface anti-tank guided missile developed by Turkish armor and missile manufacturer Roketsan.

Background

The UMTAS program was begun in late 2003 by Turkey's Undersecretariat for Defence Industries (SSM), specifically to provide TAI/AgustaWestland T129 ATAK combat helicopters with an indigenous guided missile.
The UMTAS has been designed to engage tanks and heavily armoured vehicles. It can be integrated in various platforms, including helicopters, UAVs, land vehicles, stationary platforms, light assault aircraft, ships.

Description
The UMTAS missile has fire and forget and fire and update infrared guidance with a tandem anti-tank warfare warhead. The laser guided version is marketed as the L-UMTAS. İsmail Demir, the Head of Defence Industry of Turkiye stated that it can engage targets at 16 kilometers.

Abilities:
 Fire behind mask
 Can be used day or night and in adverse weather
 Tandem-charge warhead, effective against reactive armour
 Insensitive munition characteristics against liquid fuel fire and bullet hits
 Communication of seeker image to user and command by user using data-link
 Lock-on before or after launch (L-UMTAS)
 Update of aim point on target (UMTAS)
 Switch targets during flight (UMTAS)
 Direct fire or top attack (UMTAS)
 Fire-and-forget, fire-and-update modes (UMTAS)

Development
Phase 1 (design) began in 2005 and finished in 2008.

Phase 2 (development and qualification) began in 2008 and finished in 2015.

The L-UMTAS and UMTAS version have been integrated and fired successfully from helicopters: a Turkish TAI/AgustaWestland T129 ATAK against land targets, and a US Sikorsky SH-60 Seahawk against sea targets.

A UMTAS was test dropped successfully from a Baykar Bayraktar TB2 unmanned combat aerial vehicle (UCAV). The missile was released at an altitude of 16,000 ft to hit a 2×2 meter target self laser designated from the drone, from 8 kilometres away. These missile tests may be a step in a related program to use MAM weapons with Bayraktar drones.

The MAM-L smart munition was developed from L-UMTAS.

Serial production has begun with the delivery dates set in 2016.

References

Anti-tank guided missiles
Anti-tank guided missiles of Turkey
Air-to-surface missiles of Turkey
Roketsan products
Military equipment introduced in the 2010s
Fire-and-forget weapons